Rost may refer to:

People:

Andrea Rost (born 1962), Hungarian lyric soprano
Burkhard Rost (born 1961), German scientist - computational biologists
Christina Rost (born 1952), German former women's team handball player
Clarence Rost (born 1914), former Canadian professional ice hockey player
Erik Rost (born 1985), Swedish ski-orienteering competitor
Frank Rost (born 1973), German footballer who plays as a goalkeeper
Jan Rost, German physicist
Johann Leonhard Rost (1688–1727), German astronomer and author from Nuremberg
John Rost (born 1944),) is a former British ice hockey player
Jürgen Rost, classical guitarist and professor of guitar
Karl Rost (1880–1919), German entomologist and insect dealer
Marinus Bernardus Rost van Tonningen (1852–1927), Dutch Major General
Markus Rost, German mathematician who works at the intersection of topology and algebra
Meinoud Rost van Tonningen (1894–1945), Dutch politician of the National Socialist Movement
Monika Rost (born 1943), classical guitarist, lutenist and professor
Peter Rost (doctor), M.D. (born 1959), former vice president at the pharmaceutical company Pfizer
Peter Rost (handballer) (born 1951), former German Team handball player
Peter Rost (UK politician) (born 1930), retired British Conservative politician and Member of Parliament
Pierre Adolphe Rost (1797–1868), Louisiana politician, diplomat, lawyer, judge, and plantation owner
Randi J. Rost (born 1960), computer graphics professional and frequent contributor to graphics standards
Timo Rost (born 1978), German footballer who currently plays for RB Leipzig
Yuri Rost (born 1939), Ukrainian photographer, journalist, author and traveller

See also
Røst, municipality in Nordland county, Norway
Rost (crater), lunar impact crater that is located in the southwestern part of the Moon, to the southeast of the elongated formation Schiller
Rost Township, Jackson County, Minnesota, township in Jackson County, Minnesota, United States
Rost, Minnesota, unincorporated community, United States
Tensbüttel-Röst, municipality in the district of Dithmarschen, in Schleswig-Holstein, Germany
I din röst (In your voice), an album by the Swedish singer Charlotte Perrelli

fr:Rost (homonymie)